Michael Philip Christie (born 21 April 1981) is an English singer-songwriter, composer, and baritone for the music group G4, along with Jonathan Ansell. During the COVID-19 pandemic, he released a song called "Stay At Home", to go with his other songs like "September". He is currently performing online concerts via CrowdCast named "The Mike Must Go On". He also performs after shows, known as "Aftershow Deflation".

Early life 
Mike Christie was born in Redhill, Surrey.  He began singing professionally at the age of eight when he was offered a place as a chorister at Reigate St Mary's Choir School, and in 1993 he moved on to Ardingly College, where he studied singing under John Dudley and Robert Hammersley, Director of Music. During this period, he appeared in the film Four Weddings and a Funeral as a member of a choir at one of the weddings, along with others his age. After his voice broke, Mike Christie took a couple of years out, taking A levels in Chemistry, Art & Design and Music before returning to singing at the age of seventeen. He later spent four years at Guildhall School of Music and Drama, graduating in 2004 with Honours in Singing and Piano.

G4
Before graduating, Mike Christie competed in The X Factor as a member of G4 with Jonathan Ansell, Matt Stiff, and Ben Thapa where they placed second behind Steve Brookstein. The group released three albums before their split in 2007. However, after a seven-year hiatus, G4 reunited for a reunion concert at the Barbican Hall, with Nick Ashby replacing Matt Stiff as he wanted to concentrate on his solo operatic career. The same night G4 announced that they would follow the concert with a Reunion Tour around the country. This was a success that led to Reunion Concert Tour across the UK. Mike Christie has also been on a Christmas By Candlelight Tour along with the other members of G4 in 2015, in 2016 and in 2017 as well. In 2016, G4 went on a Back For Good Tour with special female guest singers Margaret Keys, Katie Marshell and Alessandra Paonessa for the April leg of the tour but for September they were joined by Britain's Got Talent starts Vox Vortura.

In 2017, G4 released their 5th album 'Love Songs' featuring Merrill Osmond and Lesley Garrett and taking it on a 32-date tour around the UK and Ireland. Along with The X Factor China winner Mary-Jess Leaverland and saxophone player Oli Nez, but for the show in London Union Chapel G4 were joined by Merrill Osmond and Lesley Garrett. G4 also took their Christmas by Candlelight Tour around the UK for the third year running.

2018 has led G4 to embark on a 36-night tour 'Live in Concert 2018' during March and September with a trip back through memory lane, G4 will then take to the stage again during November and December with the fourth Christmas by Candlelight Tour.

Solo career 
In 2010, Mike Christie released his debut solo album To The Fore which was a departure from the classical crossover songs he had been known for, and included several self-penned songs including "Why Not Today"; prior to this, he had headlined his Showstoppers tour in Birmingham and London. A year later, he featured in a production of The Glorious Ones, and in 2013, his own opera The Miller's Wife – written entirely in English – was shown at the Arcola theatre.

Mike Christie has been participating in opera at Opera Holland Park in London since 2016 and has appeared in Isabeau in summer 2018. In 2017, Mike Christie was involved in performances of Verdi's Macbeth where he played the role of Banquo.

Mike Christie went on a Solo tour in October 2017 with songs from his album To The Fore. Mike also announced that he was making a new album via PledgeMusic which was released on 5 October 2018 entitled '10 Years On' which was followed by a 5-date tour 'An Evening with Mike Christie Up Close and Personal' which included songs from this album and guests at certain venues Daniel Boys, Mary-Jess Leaverland & Kyle Thomlinson. 

In 2022, he did a valentine tour which included tea at The Ritz. He included this with his CrowdCast online shows, streaming from the stage. He included several merchandise with this tour.

Other work
Mike Christie worked in property development shortly after the G4's split. Since the reformation of G4, Mike Christie has opened his own production company 'Amick Productions' which promotes tours of which G4, Vox Fortura and the Chinese version of 'The X Factor' winner Mary-Jess Leaverland have been included.

The Wight Proms
Mike Christie's Production Company Amick Productions staged a 4-day outdoor prom on the Isle of Wight 'The Wight Proms' in August 2018 at Northwood House. The event featured Blake, Kerry Ellis as well as other West End stars and local island talent.

References

External links
 Mike Christie's Official Website

1981 births
People educated at Ardingly College
People educated at Reigate St Mary's School
Alumni of the Guildhall School of Music and Drama
G4 (group) members
Living people
People from Redhill, Surrey